Thank You Very Many – Greatest Hits & Rarities is a greatest hits album by the Leningrad Cowboys released in Germany 13 September 1999.

Track listing

References

Leningrad Cowboys albums
1999 greatest hits albums